Miroslav Božok (born 6 March 1984) is a Slovak footballer who plays as a midfielder.

Club career 
Božok began his career at MFK Zemplín Michalovce. In 2002, he moved to Senec to play for FC Senec team. A half a year later he joined MFK Ružomberok to play in the Slovak Superliga. He won the Superliga championship and the Slovak Cup in 2005–06 season with MFK Ružomberok.

In July 2011, he joined GKS Bełchatów on a two-year contract.

In February 2013, he returned to MFK Zemplín Michalovce.

International career 
He played for the Slovakia national under-18 football team in 2002.

In 2002 and 2003 Božok played for the Slovakia national under-19 football team in UEFA European Under-19 Championship qualifying rounds.

In 2006, he played 4 matches for the Slovakia national under-21 football team.

Statistics

Honours

MFK Ružomberok
 Superliga: 2005–06
 Slovak Cup: 2005–06

Arka Gdynia
 Polish Cup: 2016–17

References

External links
 

1984 births
Living people
Slovak footballers
Slovak expatriate footballers
MFK Ružomberok players
Arka Gdynia players
GKS Bełchatów players
MFK Zemplín Michalovce players
Slovak Super Liga players
Ekstraklasa players
Expatriate footballers in Poland
People from Michalovce
Sportspeople from the Košice Region
Association football wingers